"Heat Dies Down" is a song from English indie rock group Kaiser Chiefs' second album, Yours Truly, Angry Mob, and is the third track on that album. Although the song was never released as an actual single, music channels started airing a music video for it in January, 2008. Radio stations such as XFM, also started playing the song on the radio at around that time. The video consists of a compilation of on-tour footage and studio recording.

The song also reached Number 9 on the Apple iTunes Driving Songs Chart on 9 June 2008.

2008 singles
Kaiser Chiefs songs
2007 songs
Songs written by Ricky Wilson (British musician)
Songs written by Andrew White (musician)
Songs written by Simon Rix
Songs written by Nick Hodgson
B-Unique Records singles
Songs written by Nick "Peanut" Baines